400 may refer to:

 400 (number), the natural number following 399 and preceding 401
 A year: 400 BC or AD 400
 The Four Hundred, the oligarchic government controlling Athens after the Athenian coup of 411 BC
 The Four Hundred (1892), the social elite of New York City in the late 19th century
 The Four Hundred (band), an American indie rock band
 The Game's Four Hundred, the subtitle of the almanac, the Baseball Register
List of highways numbered 400
 Twin Cities 400, a passenger train operated by Chicago & Northwestern Railway from 1935 to 1963
 400 (card game), a Lebanese trick-taking game
 HTTP 400, the HTTP error code for "Bad Request"
 Ping Shan stop, Hong Kong; station code

See also
 400 series (disambiguation)